The Philippines is inhabited by more than 182 ethnolinguistic groups,  many of which are classified as "Indigenous Peoples" under the country's Indigenous Peoples' Rights Act of 1997. Traditionally-Muslim peoples from the southernmost island group of Mindanao are usually categorized together as Moro peoples, whether they are classified as Indigenous peoples or not. About 142 are classified as non-Muslim Indigenous People groups, and about 19 ethnolinguistic groups are classified as neither indigenous nor moro. Various migrant groups have also had a significant presence throughout the country's history.

The Muslim-majority ethnic groups ethnolinguistic groups of Mindanao, Sulu, and Palawan are collectively referred to as the Moro people, a broad category which includes some indigenous people groups and some non-indigenous people groups. With a population of over 5 million people, they  comprise about 5% of the country's total population. The Spanish called them Moros after the Moors, despite no resemblance or cultural ties to them apart from their religion.

About 142 of the Philippines' Indigenous People groups are not classified as Moro peoples. Some of these people groups are commonly grouped together due to their strong association with a shared geographic area, although these broad categorizations are not always welcomed by the ethnic groups themselves. For example, the indigenous peoples of the Cordillera Mountain Range in northern Luzon are often referred to using the exonym "Igorot people," or more recently, as the Cordilleran peoples. Meanwhile, the non-Moro peoples of Mindanao are collectively referred to as the Lumad, a collective autonym conceived in 1986 as a way to distinguish them from their neighboring indigenous Moro and Visayan neighbors.

About 86 to 87 percent of the Philippine population belong to the 19 ethnolinguistic groups are classified as neither indigenous nor Moro. These groups are sometimes collectively referred to as "Lowland Christianized groups," to distinguish them from the other ethnolinguistic groups. The most populous of these groups, with populations exceeding a million individuals, are the Ilocano, the Pangasinense, the Kapampangan, the Tagalog, the Bicolano, and the Visayans (including the Cebuano, the Boholano, the Hiligaynon/Ilonggo, and the Waray). Many of these groups converted to Christianity, particularly both the native and migrant lowland-coastal groups, and adopted foreign elements of culture throughout the country's history.

Due to the past history of the Philippines since the Spanish colonial era, there are also some historical migrant heritage groups such as the Chinese Filipinos and Spanish Filipinos, both of whom intermixed with the above lowland Austronesian-speaking ethnic groups, which produced Filipino Mestizos. These groups also comprise and contribute a considerable proportion of the country's population, especially its bourgeois, and economy and were integral to the establishment of the country, from the rise of Filipino nationalism by the Ilustrado intelligentsia to the Philippine Revolution. Other peoples of migrant and/or mixed descent include those such as, American Filipinos, Indian Filipinos, Japanese Filipinos, and many more.

Aside from migrant groups which speak their own languages, most Filipinos speak languages classified under the Austronesian language family, including the various Negrito peoples of the archipelago, which are genetically and phenotypically distinct from the other ethnic groups of the Philippines. While these groups have maintained a culture and identity distinct from neighboring ethnic groups, they have long adapted their neighbors' Austronesian languages. Traditionally subcategorized geographically as the Ati people of Visayas and Mindanao, and the Aeta of Luzon, the Negrito population was estimated at 31,000 as of 2004.

Origins
There are several opposing theories regarding the origins of ancient Filipinos, starting with the "Waves of Migration" hypothesis of H. Otley Beyer in 1948, which claimed that Filipinos were "Indonesians" and "Malays" who migrated to the islands. This is completely rejected by modern anthropologists and is not supported by any evidence, but the hypothesis is still widely taught in Filipino elementary and public schools resulting in the widespread misconception by Filipinos that they are "Malays".

The most widely accepted theory, however, is the "Out-of-Taiwan" model which follows the Austronesian expansion during the Neolithic in a series of maritime migrations originating from Taiwan that spread to the islands of the Indo-Pacific; ultimately reaching as far as New Zealand, Easter Island, and Madagascar. Austronesians themselves originated from the Neolithic rice-cultivating pre-Austronesian civilizations of the Yangtze River delta in coastal southeastern China pre-dating the conquest of those regions by the Han Chinese. This includes civilizations like the Liangzhu culture, Hemudu culture, and the Majiabang culture. It connects speakers of the Austronesian languages in a common linguistic and genetic lineage, including the Taiwanese indigenous peoples, Islander Southeast Asians, Chams, Islander Melanesians, Micronesians, Polynesians, and the Malagasy people. Aside from language and genetics, they also share common cultural markers like multihull and outrigger boats, tattooing, rice cultivation, wetland agriculture, teeth blackening, jade carving, betel nut chewing, ancestor worship, and the same domesticated plants and animals (including dogs, pigs, chickens, yams, bananas, sugarcane, and coconuts).

Prehistoric Tabon Man, found in Palawan in 1962 was, until 2007, the oldest human remains discovered by anthropologists in the Philippines. Archaeological evidence indicates similarities with two early human fossils found in Indonesia and China, called the Java Man and Peking Man. In 2007, a single metatarsal from an earlier fossil was discovered in Callao Cave, Peñablanca, Cagayan. That earlier fossil was named as Callao Man.

The Negritos arrived about 30,000 years ago and occupied several scattered areas throughout the islands. Recent archaeological evidence described by Peter Bellwood claimed that the ancestors of Filipinos, Malaysians, and Indonesians first crossed the Taiwan Strait during the Prehistoric period. These early mariners are thought to be the Austronesian people. They used boats to cross the oceans, and settled into many regions of Southeast Asia, the Polynesian Islands, and Madagascar.

Two early East Asian waves (Austroasiatic and possible Austric) were detected, one most strongly evidenced among the Manobo people who live in inland Mindanao, and the other in the Sama-Bajau and related people of the Sulu archipelago, Zamboanga Peninsula, and Palawan. The admixture found in the Sama people indicates a relationship with the Lua and Mlabri people of mainland Southeast Asia, and reflects a similar genetic signal found in western Indonesia. These happened sometime after 15,000 years ago and 12,000 years ago respectively, around the time the last glacial period was coming to an end.

The first Austronesians reached the Philippines at around 2200 BC, settling the Batanes Islands and northern Luzon. From there, they rapidly spread downwards to the rest of the islands of the Philippines and Southeast Asia, as well as voyaging further east to reach the Northern Mariana Islands by around 1500 BC. They assimilated the older Negrito groups which arrived during the Paleolithic, resulting in the modern Filipino ethnic groups which all display various ratios of genetic admixture between Austronesian and Negrito groups. By the 14th century, the Malayo-Polynesian ethnolinguistic groups had dominated and displaced the Negrito population in most areas. Traders from southern China, Japan, India and Arabia, also contributed to the ethnic, and cultural development of the islands. Papuan ancestry was also detected among the ethnic Blaan and Sangir people of Mindanao, suggesting that there was westward expansion of peoples from Papua New Guinea into the Philippines. The integration of Southeast Asia into Indian Ocean trading networks around 2,000 years ago also shows some impact, with South Asian genetic signals present within some Sama-Bajau communities.

By the 16th century, Spanish colonization brought new groups of people to the Philippines mainly Spaniards and Mexicans. Many settled in the Philippines, and intermarried with the indigenous population. This gave rise to the Filipino mestizo or individuals of mixed Austronesian and Hispanic descent. There was migration of a military nature from Latin-America (Mexico and Peru) to the Philippines, composed of varying races (Amerindian, Mestizo and Criollo) as described by Stephanie J. Mawson in her book "Convicts or Conquistadores? Spanish Soldiers in the Seventeenth-Century Pacific". Also, in her dissertation paper called, ‘Between Loyalty and Disobedience: The Limits of Spanish Domination in the Seventeenth Century Pacific’, she recorded an accumulated number of 15,600 soldier-settlers sent to the Philippines from Latin-America during the 1600s. In contrast, there were only 600 Spaniards who immigrated from Europe, in which timeframe, the total population of the Philippines was only about 667,612. Another 35,000 Mexican immigrants arrived in the 1700s and they were part of a Philippine population of 1.2 Million, forming about 2.91% of the population. Old Spanish censuses state that as much as 33.5% or one third of the population of the main island of Luzon had full or partial Hispanic or Latino (Mestizo and Native-American) descent.

The current modern-day Chinese Filipinos are mostly the descendants of immigrants from Southern Fujian in China from the 20th century and late 19th century, possibly numbering around 2 million, although there are an estimated 27 percent of Filipinos who have partial Chinese ancestry, stemming from precolonial and colonial Chinese (Sangley) migrants from the past centuries especially during the Spanish Colonial Era. Intermarriage between the groups is evident in the major cities and urban areas, and spans back to Spanish colonial times, where a colonial middle-class group known as the Mestizo de Sangley (Chinese mestizos) descend from. Its descendants during the late 19th century produced a major part of the ilustrado intelligentsia of the late Spanish Colonial Philippines, that were very influential with the creation of Filipino nationalism and the sparking of the Philippine Revolution.

There are also Japanese people, which include escaped Christians (Kirishitan) who fled the persecutions of Shogun Tokugawa Ieyasu which the Spanish empire in the Philippines had offered asylum from to form part of the Japanese settlement in the Philippines. In the 16th and 17th centuries, thousands of Japanese people traders also migrated to the Philippines and assimilated into the local population.

The Philippines was a former American colony and during the American colonial era, there were over 800,000 Americans who were born in the Philippines. , there were 220,000 to 600,000 American citizens living in the country. There are also 250,000 Amerasians scattered across the cities of Angeles City, Manila, and Olongapo.

Practicing forensic anthropology, while exhuming cranial bones in several Philippine cemeteries, researcher Matthew C. Go estimated that 7% of the mean amount, among the samples exhumed, have attribution to European descent. Research work published in the Journal of Forensic Anthropology, collating contemporary Anthropological data show that the percentage of Filipino bodies who were sampled from the University of the Philippines, that is phenotypically classified as Asian (East, South and Southeast Asian) is 72.7%, Hispanic (Spanish-Amerindian Mestizo, Latin American, and/or Spanish-Malay Mestizo) is at 12.7%, Indigenous American (Native American) at 7.3%, African at 4.5%, and European at 2.7%.

Genetics

The results of a massive DNA study conducted by the National Geographic's, "The Genographic Project", based on genetic testings of 80,000 Filipino people by the National Geographic in 2008–2009, found that the average Filipino's genes are around 53% Southeast Asia and Oceania, 36% East Asian, 5% Southern European, 3% South Asian and 2% Native American.

Native ethnolinguistic groups

Small indigenous ethnic communities remain marginalized, and often poorer than the rest of society.

Moro ethnolinguistic groups 

The collective term Moro people or Bangsamoro people refers to the, at least 13, islamicized ethnolinguistic groups of Mindanao, Sulu and Palawan. As Muslim-majority ethnic groups, they form the largest non-Christian majority population in the country, and comprise about 5% of the total Philippine population, or 5 million people. Most Moros are followers of Sunni Islam of the Shafi'i madh'hab. The Muslim Moros originally had a few independent states such as the Maguindanao Sultanate, the Lanao Sultanates, and the Sulu Sultanate. The Sultanate of Sulu once exercised sovereignty over the present day provinces of Basilan, Palawan, Sulu, Tawi-Tawi, the eastern part of the Malaysian state of Sabah (formerly North Borneo) and North Kalimantan in Indonesia.

Non-Moro indigenous people groups 

There are more than 100 highland, lowland, and coastland tribal groups in the Philippines. These include:

Igorot 
The Igorots/Cordillerans live in the highlands of Luzon. They are primarily located in the Cordillera Administrative Region, Caraballo Mountains, and Sierra Madre.

Mangyan 

Mangyan is the generic name for the eight indigenous groups found on the island of Mindoro, southwest of the island of Luzon in the Philippines, each with its own tribal name, language, and customs. They occupy nearly the whole of the interior of the island of Mindoro. The total population may be around 280,000, but official statistics are difficult to determine under the conditions of remote areas, reclusive tribal groups and some having little if any outside world contact.

Tribal Palaweño 
The indigenous peoples of Palawan are a diverse group of both indigenous tribes and lowland groups that historically migrated to the island of Palawan and its outlying islands. These ethnolinguistic groups are widely distributed to the long strip of mainland island literally traversing Luzon, Visayas and Mindanao. Listed below are specifically the tribal groups of Palawan, as opposed to its urban lowland groups that historically settled its cities and towns. 
Palawan is home to many indigenous peoples whose origins date back thousands of centuries. Pre-historic discoveries reveal how abundant cultural life in Palawan survived before foreign occupiers and colonizers reached the Philippine archipelago. Today, Palawan is making its best to preserve and conserve the richness of its cultural groups. The provincial government strives to support the groups of indigenous peoples of Palawan.

Suludnon 
They are highland Visayan peoples, related to the lowland Kinaray-a, Aklanon, and Hiligaynon of Panay Island, Visayas.

Negrito 

The Negrito are several Australo-Melanesian groups who inhabit isolated parts of Southeast Asia. They all live in remote areas throughout the islands in the Philippines.

Lumad 
The Lumad are the un-Islamized and un-Christianized (or only recently Christianized) indigenous Austronesian peoples of Mindanao. They include several ethnolinguistic groups such as the Manobo, the Tasaday, the Mamanwa, the Mandaya, the B'laan, the T'boli, and the Kalagan. They primarily inhabit the eastern parts of Mindanao such as the Caraga, and Davao Regions.

Other ethnolinguistic groups 
About 86 to 87 percent of the Philippine population belong to the ethnolinguistic groups are classified as neither indigenous nor moro. These groups are sometimes collectively referred to as "Lowland Christianized groups," to distinguish them from indigenous ("upland") groups and moro peoples.

Groups in mainland Luzon 
Lowland Christianized groups of the island of Luzon.

Groups in the Mimaropa Region 
Lowland Christianized groups of the region of Mimaropa, consisting of the islands or provinces of Mindoro, Marinduque, Romblon, Palawan, and other surrounding islands.

Groups in the Visayas 

Lowland Christianized groups of the Visayas archipelago. The Visayans are a metaethnicity race native to the whole Visayas, to the southernmost islands of Luzon and the northern and eastern coastal parts of Mindanao. They are speakers of one or more Visayan languages, the most widely spoken being Cebuano, Hiligaynon and Waray-Waray. Other groups speak smaller languages such as Aklanon, Boholano, Butuanon, Capiznon, Eskaya, Kinaray-a, Masbateño, Porohanon, Romblomanon, and Surigaonon. If speakers of the Visayan languages are to be grouped together, they would comprise the largest ethnic group in the nation, numbering at around 33 million as of 2010.

Groups in Mindanao 
Lowland Christianized groups of the island of Mindanao.

Immigrants & mixed peoples 

The Philippines consists of a wide number of settlers that form part of the national population. They historically immigrated or descended from various countries or lands throughout the history of the Philippines, from as early as the precolonial period, the Spanish colonial period, the American colonial period, Japanese occupation, and modern era. Historically in the context of modern countries, they most notably came from Spain, Mexico, China, the United States, Japan, and India. Much of these immigrant peoples throughout the centuries eventually integrated or assimilated into the country's population, producing new groups of intermixed people that many identify as part of their Filipino identity.

Across the Philippines for the past centuries especially since the Spanish Colonial Era, the main historical migrant heritage groups are also the Chinese Filipinos and Spanish Filipinos who in Spanish Colonial Times later intermixed with the above lowland native Filipino ethnic groups, which produced the Mestizo de Sangley (Chinese Mestizo) and Mestizo de Español (Spanish Mestizo) respectively. There was also the rarer mix of Tornatrás during the Spanish Colonial Era, who were either the mix of both the Spanish and Chinese (Sangley) in Spanish Colonial Philippines or the mix of the Chinese mestizo and Spanish mestizo, resulting in carrying all three ancestries from Spanish, Chinese, and native Filipino ancestry. Historically though, it was the Mestizo de Sangley (Chinese Mestizo) that numbered the most among mestizos, though the Mestizos de Español (Spanish Mestizos) carried more social prestige due to the colonial caste system hierarchy that usually elevated Spanish blood and christianization to the peak, hence many Filipinos today associate the term "mestizo" with Spanish mestizos, while most descendants of the Mestizo de Sangley (Chinese Mestizo), despite assuming many of the important roles in the economic, social, and political life of the nation, also later readily assimilated into the fabric of Philippine society or sometimes falsely claim Spanish descent due to this situation.

Historical foreign migrants and intermixed peoples 
These groups are the historical foreign migrant peoples and the intermixed peoples they produced with native groups, especially the native urban lowland peoples of the Philippines. Those listed below are those groups in modern times that still have some number of Filipinos claiming identity with such background.

Recent modern immigrants and expatriates 

These migrant groups are relatively recent immigrants and expatriate groups that mostly immigrated in the modern era, specifically around the 20th century especially from post-WW2 Philippine independence to the present era. Recent modern immigrants, expatriates, foreign students, foreign citizens with work permits and resident aliens are all included. Common reasons for modern immigration into the Philippines include employment, education, tourism, marriage migration counter flow from returning overseas Filipino workers and emigrants, etc. According to a 2013 country migration report, the recent most notable nationalities of foreign aliens with work permits include Koreans, Chinese, Japanese, Americans, Germans and British (either British citizen or British National (Overseas) – from British Hong Kong). Most of these foreign aliens with work permits are based in the National Capital Region (Metro Manila), followed by Calabarzon (Southern Tagalog), and Central Visayas, representing the more developed regions of the country. Most of them are employed in the manufacturing sector, although they tend to be involved in other sectors as well. The majority work in administrative, executive and managerial positions. The top three nationalities of registered aliens are Chinese (59,000), Koreans (39,000) and Americans (26,000). According to the 2010 Census of Population and Housing, the top five countries of origin of foreign citizens were: the United States of America (29,959), China, (28,750), Japan (11,583), and India (8,963) (NSO, 2012). Europeans, Africans, or those from Latin America are often confused with Americans in the Philippines, leading to many being referred to as Kano (short for Amerikano).

See also
 Demographics of the Philippines
 List of sovereign state leaders in the Philippines
 Indigenous peoples of the Philippines
 Philippine population by country of citizenship

Notes

Citations

References
 
 
 
 
 
 
 Kagayanen; by: Jehu P. Cayaon; https://web.archive.org/web/20110819055403/http://kagayanenmovement.webs.com/

External links
 Philippines – Ethnic groups, thecorpusjuris.com, retrieved on 2008-04-06 (See Article XV, Section 3(3))
 Who are the Kagayanens?, Indigenous People Movement